The 2022 OFC Women's Nations Cup Group C is the third of three sets in the group stage of the 2022 OFC Women's Nations Cup that will take place from  to . The group competition will consist of hosts Fiji, New Caledonia, and Solomon Islands. The top two teams automatically qualify for the top eight knockout stage, while third place is comparatively evaluated to other third-placed teams based on the football ranking system for the last two berths.

Teams

Standings

Matches

Solomon Islands vs Fiji

Fiji vs New Caledonia

New Caledonia vs Solomon Islands

Discipline

Fair play points would have been used as tiebreakers in the group if the overall and head-to-head records of teams were tied, or if teams had the same record in the ranking of third-placed teams. These were calculated based on yellow and red cards received in all group matches as follows:

 yellow card = 1 point
 red card as a result of two yellow cards = 3 points
 direct red card = 3 points
 yellow card followed by direct red card = 4 points

References

 
Group C